The Trip Around the Sun Tour was the sixteenth headlining concert tour by American country music artist Kenny Chesney. It began on April 21, 2018, in Tampa, Florida and finished on August 25, 2018, in Foxborough, Massachusetts. The tour played NFL, MLB, and MLS stadiums, and amphitheaters. The tour was first announced in October 2017.

Commercial reception
The tour was marked as Chesney's biggest ever, earning $114.3 million. 1.289 million tickets were reportedly sold.

Opening acts
Thomas Rhett
Dierks Bentley
Old Dominion
Brandon Lay

Setlists
This setlist is a representation of the June 2, 2018, show in Pittsburgh.
"Beer in Mexico"
"Reality"
"Til It's Gone"
"Summertime"
"Pirate Flag"
"No Shoes, No Shirt, No Problems"
"Somewhere with You"
"I Go Back"
"Get Along"
"Anything but Mine"
"Save It for a Rainy Day" 
"When the Sun Goes Down" 
"All the Pretty Girls"
"Living in Fast Forward"
"Young"
"Noise"
"American Kids"
"Setting the World on Fire"
"Everything's Gonna Be Alright" 
"Dust on the Bottle" 
"How Forever Feels"
"Big Star"
"Don't Happen Twice"
Encore
"She Thinks My Tractor's Sexy"

Tour dates

References

2018 concert tours
Kenny Chesney concert tours